Edwin Bowey (5 January 1928 – 2016) was a British wrestler who competed for Great Britain in the 1948 Summer Olympics.

Wrestling career
Bowey competed in the 1948 Olympic Games.

Bowey represented England and won a bronze medal in the 60 kg division at the 1950 British Empire Games in Auckland, New Zealand.

Personal life and death
During the Games in 1950 he lived at George Crescent, Muswell Hill, London and was a horticulturist by trade. He emigrated to New Zealand the following year and worked as a lumberjack but later returned to England to work as a gardener. He had an interest in yoga since the 1940s and travelled to India in the Sixties. In 2012, he was part of a photo essay on the 1948 British Olympians.

Bowey died in Enfield, London in 2016.

References

External links
 

1928 births
2016 deaths
British male sport wrestlers
Commonwealth Games competitors for England
English male wrestlers
Olympic wrestlers of Great Britain
Wrestlers at the 1948 Summer Olympics
Wrestlers at the 1950 British Empire Games